The Belfast Water Commissioners was a public body in Ireland and later Northern Ireland, established by the Belfast Water Act 1840, to improve the supply of water to the expanding city of Belfast. By 1852, the city was suffering a shortfall in supply of almost one million gallons per day. In 1889 the body's name was changed to Belfast City and District Water Commissioners in recognition of the expanding boundaries of Belfast and resulting increased demand for water.

Major infrastructure completed for the Belfast City and District Water Commissioners includes the Mourne Conduit, the Mourne Wall, Silent Valley Reservoir, the Binnian Tunnel and Ben Crom Reservoir.

The Water Commissioners' responsibilities were transferred to the Department of the Environment's Water Executive in 1974 and are now managed by Northern Ireland Water.

History
The Belfast Water Commissioners was a public body established by the Belfast Water Act 1840, to improve the supply of water to the expanding city of Belfast. By 1852, the city was suffering a shortfall in supply of almost one million gallons per day.

In 1889, the expansion of Belfast's boundaries and increased demand for water lead to the change of name to Belfast City and District Water Commissioners or BC&DWC.

In 1891, the Commissioners appointed local civil engineer, Luke Livingston Macassey to identify water resources to sustain Belfast. Macassey ruled out Lough Neagh which as the largest lake in the British Isles would have been an abundant source of water, however water quality was a concern and its altitude meant that water would have to be pumped to Belfast.  Other sources in County Down, and County Antrim were rejected:

 Mcauley's Lake in Ballynahinch - Altitude favourable, however too small a body of water to justify investment and quality not high.
 Slieve Croob - Risk of disputes with mill owners ruled out this source
 Bryansford in Newcastle - Like Ballynahinch, too small a quantity of water to justify investment
 Upper Bann area near Banbridge
 Clady, Glenravel and Glenarm, County Antrim

Macassey ultimately recommended on the Mourne Mountains in Down. Upon deciding on the site, water commissioners agreed on securing a  catchment area. Private Acts of Parliament (in 1893, 1897 and 1899) allowed the purchase of the Mournes land and related access permits and water rights.

The first stage was to divert water from the Kilkeel and Annalong rivers through the Mourne Conduit to a reservoir near Carryduff. These water pipes and tunnels were capable of supplying  of water per day. Work was completed in 1901. The second stage was to build a storage reservoir, the Silent Valley Reservoir across the Kilkeel River, to supply another  of water per day. Design work on this phase began in 1910, but procurement of the work was delayed by World War I. A contract was eventually awarded in 1923 to S. Pearson & Son and work continued until 1933.

The commissioners were responsible for the construction of the Mourne Wall which encloses the catchment area.  Northern Ireland Water began to restore in this strcuutre in 2017.

In 1938, the commissioners purchased a building now known as the Water Office due to the need for more office space. It was purchased by Marks & Spencer in 1983 and became part of its extended city centre store.

Irish Boundary Commission
The Irish Boundary Commission was established in 1924 to decide on the delineation of the border between the Irish Free State and Northern Ireland.  The BC&DWC made representations to that body, objecting to any movement of the border north from the existing County Down boundary on the following grounds:
That the existing boundary of Carlingford Lough was a natural boundary and therefore preferable to an artificial boundary.
A movement of the border northwards, but not ecompassing the Mourne Mountains, would make the Silent Valley and related infrastructure more vulnerable to attack and would necessitate continuous protection.
A boundary to the north of the Commissioner's facilities in the Mourne Mountains would place the source of water in a different jurisdiction from the areas served which would involve the risk of "interference with the undertaking, restrictions in the use of the water [and] increased taxation"
The latter would have financial implications for the BC&DWC, for example their ability to raise finance.

The border was ultimately unchanged, leaving the Mourne catchment area and water infrastructure within Northern Ireland.

Successor organisations
The powers vested in the Belfast City and District Water Commissioners were transferred to the Minister of Development on 1 October 1973. Provision of water and sewerage services became the responsibility of the Water Service by 1 January 1974, itself a division of the Department of the Environment. In 1996, the Water Executive became an executive agency and was rebranded as the Northern Ireland Water Service and, in 1999, responsibility for water transferred to the Department for Regional Development. The Northern Ireland Water Service became Northern Ireland Water in April 2007.

Relevant legislation
Belfast Water Act, 1840
Commissioner' Clauses Act, 1847
Waterworks' Clauses Act, 1847
Waterworks' Clauses Act, 1863
Belfast Water Act, 1865
Belfast Water Act, 1874
Belfast Water Act, 1879
Belfast Water Act, 1884
Belfast Water Act, 1889
Belfast Water Act, 1893
The Belfast City and District Water Commissioners (Postponement of Elections) Order (Northern Ireland) 1940
The Belfast Water Order (Northern Ireland) 1948
The Belfast Water Order (Northern Ireland) 1953
The Belfast Water Order (Northern Ireland) 1965
The Belfast Water Order (Northern Ireland) 1967
The Belfast Water Order (Northern Ireland) 1972
The Water and Sewerage Services Regulations (Northern Ireland) 1973

References

Notes

Citations

External links
 

 
1840 establishments in Ireland
Water supply and sanitation in Ireland
Organisations based in Belfast
History of Belfast